Intelsat 21 is a communications satellite manufactured by Boeing Space Systems (BSS) for the Intelsat Corporation, based on the BSS-702MP satellite bus. It was launched on 19 August 2012 at 06:54:59 UTC by a Zenit-3SL launch vehicle from a mobile platform in the equatorial Pacific Ocean. and replaces the Intelsat 9 satellite at 58° West Longitude.

References 

Intelsat satellites
Satellites using the BSS-702 bus
Communications satellites in geostationary orbit
Spacecraft launched in 2012